Carlos González (born 10 December 1955) is a Panamanian former swimmer. He competed in two events at the 1976 Summer Olympics.

References

External links
 

1955 births
Living people
Panamanian male swimmers
Olympic swimmers of Panama
Swimmers at the 1976 Summer Olympics
Place of birth missing (living people)
20th-century Panamanian people
21st-century Panamanian people